Amirkhiz is an ancient and historic district in northwestern part of Tabriz. It is limited to Aji Chay in the north and Meydan Chayi in the south. Istanbul gate, one of the eight famous and ancient gates of Tabriz is located in the south of this district.

Sources
خاماچی،بهروز.شهر من تبریز (My City Tabriz, Behruz Khamachi)

Districts of Tabriz